Hamid Kohram (‎;  – 19 March 2020) was an Iranian politician and veterinarian who served as a member of the Iranian Parliament representing Ahwaz between 2000 and 2004. He was also the Director General of Scholarships Office and Student Exchange, Ministry of Science, Research and Technology.

During the 2017 presidential election, Kohram was the head of Hassan Rouhani's campaign in Khuzestan province.

Kohram died from COVID-19 on 19 March 2020.  He was 61 or 62 years old.

References

1950s births
2020 deaths
People from Ahvaz
Iranian politicians
Members of the 6th Islamic Consultative Assembly
People from Khuzestan Province
Deaths from the COVID-19 pandemic in Iran
21st-century Iranian politicians
Male veterinarians
Iranian veterinarians